Mustapha Haciane, also spelt as Mustafa Haciane, (born in 1935) is an Algerian novelist, playwright, and poet. His publications often tackle social issues.

Biography
Mustapha Haciane  was born in 1935, in Rouiba, Algeria, into a family of Turkish origin. He began writing poems at the age of 17 whilst in high school. In 1950 he met with Albert Camus, and continued his studies in France and Switzerland.

During his travels, Haciane wrote the play "A quoi bon fixer le soleil" ("What is the point of fixing the sun") which was performed in Geneva in 1967 at the Theatre de l'Atelier.

Back in Algeria he wrote two other pieces: "La Vocation de l'abus" ("The Vocation of Abuse")  and "L'Escalier d'en face" ("The Staircase opposite").

In Rio de Janeiro he wrote Les Orphelins de l'Empereur ("The Orphans of the Emperor").

Personal life
Haciane currently resides in Paris.

Publications

Novels

Theater

References

Bibliography 
 

.

External links
LIMAG Littératures du Maghreb: HACIANE, Mustapha

1935 births
Algerian people of Turkish descent
20th-century Algerian poets
Living people
Algerian writers
Algerian male poets
Algerian dramatists and playwrights
20th-century male writers
21st-century Algerian people